Logh may refer to:

 logh (mathematics), a rare name for the natural logarithm in mathematics
 LOGH, an acronym for Legend of the Galactic Heroes, a series of science fiction novels written by Yoshiki Tanaka, adapted to anime and manga
 Logh (band), a Swedish musical group
 Logh, the Cornish name for Looe